Qoryoley (Maay: Qornyooley) is a city in southern Somalia. It is located in the Lower Shebelle region.

History

The District Mayor after the fall of the Siyad Government was Abdirahmaan Sheikh Mohamed Khadi (ShaamQoryoley), who was the youngest Mayor of all Somali Mayors in 2007, in the era of president Abdullahi Yusuf Ahmed.  In 2018 a Somali government position in Qoryoley was attacked by Al-Shabab militants, resulting in the deaths of two militants.

Demographics
Qoryoley has a population of around 62,700. The broader Qoriyoley District has a total population of 134,205.

References

External links
Qoryoley, Somalia

Populated places in Lower Shebelle